Bonshaw Provincial Park is a provincial park with hiking trails in Prince Edward Island, Canada. It has over 18km of hiking trails. Its main trail is named Ji'ka'we'katik-meaning "the place where bass is plentiful"-its traditional Mi'kmaq name.

References 

Provincial parks of Prince Edward Island
Parks in Queens County, Prince Edward Island